The first cabinet of Riad Al Solh, the first under President Bechara El Khoury, was formed on 25 September 1943 and lasted until 3 July 1944.

Members of government

References

1943 establishments in Lebanon
1944 disestablishments in Lebanon
Cabinets of Lebanon
Cabinets established in 1943
Cabinets disestablished in 1944